Ikshevo is a rural locality (a village) in Posyolok Zolotkovo, Gus-Khrustalny District, Vladimir Oblast, Russia. The population was 309 as of 2010.

Geography 
Ikshevo is located 53 km southeast of Gus-Khrustalny (the district's administrative centre) by road. Vasilyovo is the nearest rural locality.

References 

Rural localities in Gus-Khrustalny District